Narval may refer to:

Submarines 
 , an 1899 pioneering French submarine
 , a list of other French submarines
 French Narval-class submarine, French submarines of the 1950s
 Russian Narval-class submarine, Russian submarines of the early 1910s
 , a Portuguese submarine, formerly British S-class HMS Spur

Other uses 
 Narwhal, a species of whale with a long helical tusk 
 SNCASO SO.8000 Narval, a 1940s French aircraft
 Narval Bay, a bay on South Georgia Island in the southern Atlantic
 Narwal (disambiguation)